Ithycythara auberiana is a species of sea snail, a marine gastropod mollusk in the family Mangeliidae.

Tucker considers this species a synonym of Ithycythara pentagonalis Reeve, L.A., 1845

Icythara rubricata (Reeve, 1846) may be an older name for this species; see Williams (2005).

Description
The length of the shell varies between 4 mm and 8 mm.

Distribution
I. auberiana can be found in Atlantic waters, ranging from the eastern coast of Florida south to Brazil.; in the Caribbean Sea, the Gulf of Mexico and the Lesser Antilles at depths between 1 m and 100 m.

References

External links
 
 MNHN, Paris : Ithycythara auberiana

auberiana
Gastropods described in 1847